Magwagwa is a small town in Nyamusi division, Nyamira County in Kenya.

The town is inhabited by Gusii people. The town falls between Chabera-off the Kisii-Kisumu road at Sondu and Ikonge off The Kisii-Chemosit road.

The area is densely populated with the main incomes coming from small scale farming. The main cash crops are tea, coffee and pyrethrum in some places. There are no major economic projects in the area except the Sondu Miriu hydroelectric power station.

See also
Borioba

References

Populated places in Nyanza Province
Nyamira County